Cerithiopsis argentea is a species of sea snail, a gastropod in the family Cerithiopsidae. It was described by Dall in 1927.

Description

Habitat

References

argentea
Gastropods described in 1927